The World Team Ninepin Bowling Classic Championships is a biennial nine-pin bowling competition organized by the World Ninepin Bowling Association (WNBA NBC). The World Championships was started in 2005, after dividing the championships into Team and Singles.

The sprint events took place only during the first championships in Novi Sad. Since 2009, the World Team Championships have in the program only team tournaments, after removing mixed tandems.

List of championships

Medal count

List of hosts 
List of hosts by number of championships hosted.

References

 
World championships in ninepin bowling classic
Recurring sporting events established in 2005